R430 may refer to:

 R430 road (Ireland)
 Radeon R430, a microchip used for graphics